Dido, Queen of Carthage may refer to:

 Dido, founder and first queen of Carthage
 Dido, Queen of Carthage (play), a play by Christopher Marlowe
 Dido, Queen of Carthage (opera), an opera by Stephen Storace

See also
 Dido (disambiguation)